The Iron Ring is a symbolic ring worn by Canadian engineers.

Iron Ring(s)  may also refer to:
The Iron Ring, a 1997 children's novel by Lloyd Alexander
The Iron Ring (film), a 1917 American drama film directed by George Archainbaud
Iron Ring (TV series), American mixed martial arts TV series
Iron rings, physical training equipment
Iron ring (laboratory), scientific laboratory equipment
Iron Ring (Wales), a series of fortifications built by Edward I of England

See also
Bilbao's Iron Ring, Spanish Civil War fortifications
Iron Ring Clock, clock at McMaster University, Canada